Ryan Shotzberger (April 12, 1982) is an American college baseball coach and former shortstop. He is the head baseball coach at the University of the Incarnate Word. Shotzberger played college baseball at McDaniel College from 2001 to 2004 for coach Dave Seibert. He served as the head assistant at the University of Houston from 2012 to 2019.

Playing career
Shotzberger attended Wilmington Friends School in Wilmington, Delaware. He was a member of the schools varsity baseball team. He then enrolled at McDaniel College, to play college baseball for the McDaniel Green Terror baseball team. He was named First Team All-Centennial Conference in 2003 and 2004.

Coaching career
Shotzberger began his coaching career in 2005 as an assistant coach at Cecil College. He was named an assistant coach at Duke for the 2006 season. On August 22, 2006, he was named an assistant at TCU. While at TCU, Shotzberger was an assistant with Todd Whitting, who would add Shotzberger to his coaching staff at the University of Houston on August 11, 2011. Following the 2014 season, he stepped back into a Director of Player Development role. In 2018, he returned to the field as a coach.

On June 24, 2019, Shotzberger was named the 5th coach in program history for the Incarnate Word Cardinals baseball program.

Head coaching record

See also
 List of current NCAA Division I baseball coaches

References

External links
Incarnate Word Cardinals profile

Living people
1982 births
Baseball shortstops
McDaniel Green Terror baseball players
Cecil Seahawks baseball coaches
Duke Blue Devils baseball coaches
TCU Horned Frogs baseball coaches
Houston Cougars baseball coaches
Incarnate Word Cardinals baseball coaches